is a private junior college in Yonabaru, Okinawa, Japan, established in 1966. Contrary to its name, the college has been accepting male students since 2003.
This college relocated from Naha, Okinawa to current location in 2015.

External links
 Official website

Educational institutions established in 1966
Private universities and colleges in Japan
Universities and colleges in Okinawa Prefecture
1966 establishments in Okinawa
Japanese junior colleges